Murad Alyan (born December 7, 1977) is a Palestinian professional football) player playing for Hilal Al-Quds of the West Bank Premier League.

Career
Alyan grew up in Jerusalem as an Arab citizen of Israel. He joined Hapoel Jerusalem's youth set-up in 1986 as a nine-year-old after spending time with his neighborhood side Beit Safafa. While at Hapoel Jerusalem, Alyan was leading scorer at almost every youth level. He signed his first contract with Beitar Ironi Maale Adumim in 2002 scoring 18 goals, making him the team's leading scorer. In the 2003–04 season, Alyan joined Bnei Lod and helped them win Liga Bet by scoring 24 goals, a team high. The next season, he joined Ironi Ness Ziona (later renamed Sektzia Ness Ziona) and helped them win promotion to Liga Alef by scoring 28 goals. His prolific scoring at the lower levels of the Israeli League, prompted his former team, Hapoel Bnei Lod, now in Liga Artzit to re-sign him. His 11 goals helped Lod achieve a third successive promotion, to the second tier of the Israeli league Liga Leumit. He spent the next two seasons at Beitar Shimshon Tel Aviv F.C. who were playing in the third tier at the time. His final season with the club, saw him go on loan to Maccabi Kfar Qara.

In 2009, he signed his first fully fledged professional contract with Jerusalem-based Hilal Al-Quds. He scored 15 goals in his first season and finished as the West Bank Premier League top scorer. In his second season, he again finished top scorer with 20 goals in the league, he also managed an astonishing 13 goals in the Palestine FA Cup, leading Hilal Al-Quds to the title. He had a total of 35 goals in all three domestic competitions in 2010–11.

He clinched the Golden Boot for the third straight season in 2011–12 with 15 goals over the course of the 18-game season.

International career
Alyan received his first official cap for Palestine in the qualifying round of the 2012 AFC Challenge Cup. This call-up came only months after Mousa Bezaz publicly announced he would not consider Alyan due to his age. In his first game against Bangladesh, he scored two goals in a 2–0 win over Bangladesh. In the following game against the Philippines he saw one of his shots hit the post. He continued his fine run of form two days later against Myanmar where he scored Palestine's opening and final goals of the match.

International goals
Scores and results list the Palestine's goal tally first.

Honours
Best Palestinian Player: 2011

References

External links

1977 births
Living people
Arab-Israeli footballers
Arab citizens of Israel
Palestinian footballers
Palestine international footballers
Hapoel Bnei Lod F.C. players
Sektzia Ness Ziona F.C. players
Beitar Tel Aviv Bat Yam F.C. players
Maccabi Kafr Kanna F.C. players
Hilal Al-Quds Club players
Markaz Shabab Al-Am'ari players
Liga Leumit players
West Bank Premier League players
Footballers from Jerusalem
Association football forwards